Nonynes are alkynes with one triple bond and the molecular formula C9H16.

The isomers are:
 1-Nonyne
 2-Nonyne
 3-Nonyne
 4-Nonyne

Alkynes